Tomashovka, in Ukraine, is the site of an ancient mega-settlement belonging to the Cucuteni–Trypillia culture dating to 3700 BC. The settlement was for the time very large, covering an area of  hectares. This proto-city is just one of 2,440 Cucuteni-Trypillia settlements discovered so far in Moldova and Ukraine. Some 194 (8%) of these settlements had an area of more than 10 hectares between 5000–2700 BC and more than 29 settlements had an area in the range of 100 to 450 hectares.

See also
 Cucuteni–Trypillia culture
 Danubian culture

References

Cucuteni–Trypillia culture